Aab-e hayat (lit. water of life) is a commentary (or tazkira) on Urdu poetry written by Muhammad Husain Azad in 1880. The book was described as "canon-forming" and "the most often reprinted, and most widely read, Urdu book of the past century." The book is regarded as the first chronological history of Urdu poetry.

Aab-e hayat became the single most influential source for both anecdotes and historical theories about Urdu poetry. Its second edition in 1883 was incorporated into the official curriculum at Punjab University and several other schools.

It provides an important perspective on the origin  of Urdu:

References

External links
Āb-e Ḥayāt — a copy of the text translated and edited by Frances Pritchett

Urdu-language books
1880 books
19th-century Indian books
Indian linguistic philosophy